Enteromius leonensis is a species of ray-finned fish in the genus Enteromius which is found from Senegal to Sudan.

References

 

Enteromius
Taxa named by George Albert Boulenger
Fish described in 1915